Southcliffe is a British drama series that aired on Channel 4. Set in a fictional town on the North Kent Marshes, it employs a nonlinear narrative structure to tell the story of a series of shootings by a local man portrayed by Sean Harris, the cause of the shootings and the effects on the town and residents. The series explores tragedy, grief, responsibility and redemption as seen through the eyes of a journalist returning to the small town of his childhood to cover the story.

The series was filmed in Faversham in North Kent and was screened in the Special Presentation section at the 2013 Toronto International Film Festival.

Cast
 Rory Kinnear – David Whitehead
 Sean Harris – Stephen Morton
 Shirley Henderson – Claire Salter
 Anatol Yusef – Paul Gould
 Eddie Marsan – Andrew Salter
 Joe Dempsie – Chris Cooper
 Geoff Bell – Alan
 Kaya Scodelario – Anna Salter

Production
In August 2012, Channel 4 announced that they had ordered a four-part drama series titled Southcliffe. The drama was written by Tony Grisoni and produced by Warp Films, with Peter Carlton and Sophie Gardiner serving as executive producers, and Sean Durkin as director.

Conception
The story is of a fictional English market town devastated by a spate of shootings which take place on 2 November 2011. According to its writer Grisoni,  "Southcliffe is a fictional market town inhabited by fictional characters, but with similarities to many actual people and places in Britain today; invisible people, anonymous places." He added that "Southcliffe is an anthem to ordinary people's ability to reinvent themselves in the face of ultimate darkness." He denied that Southcliffes central conceit is exploitative. "It's not really a story of a spree shooting. It's a story of people who are suddenly robbed of someone very close to them." He insisted that it is vitally important not to portray the shooter as a cartoon monster but that he is a human being and should be treated as one.

Filming
Filming began in October 2012 in Faversham, on an eight-week shooting schedule, and took place at various locations in and around Faversham, including local homes, town centre streets, the Faversham Creek, Hollowshore pub, The Shipwright's Arms, Faversham Recreation Ground, The Market Inn, Oare Marshes, Uplees Cottage, as well as other locations in Kent such as Whitstable, East Kent Railway, Grain Power Station, Teynham Court Farm, Canterbury Hospital, Sittingbourne Police Station, Sittingbourne Community College, and others. Faversham Enterprise Partnership estimated that the filming generated £500,000 for the local economy.

Reception
The critical response to the first two episodes was mostly positive. Benji Wilson of The Daily Telegraph thought that with "its muted palette, protracted silences, dank fogs and seething unease, Southcliffe was anything but nice-cup-of-tea and a sit-down TV, but it was a mesmerising tragedy, nonetheless." Arifa Akbar of The Independent noted "its disturbing silences" and called it "a rare and brilliant Sunday-night viewing", while Paul Whitelaw of The Scotsman considered Southcliffe to be "a major work, and quite easily the best British TV drama of the year so far." The sentiment was shared by Euan Ferguson of The Observer, who called it "the TV event of the year." Sam Wollaston of The Guardian thought that the drama series was a masterly study of a tragedy in smalltown England, one that "felt – and looked, and sounded – so utterly and terribly real", and that it was a "profound, chilling, moving piece of television".

Serena Davies of The Daily Telegraph, however, voiced a contrary opinion and wondered if the level of violence in this show as well as other TV dramas was really necessary.

Episodes

Awards and nominations
The drama series received the most nominations at the 2014 British Academy Television Awards together with The IT Crowd, with four nominations each.

See also
 Cumbria shootings
 Dunblane school massacre
 Hungerford massacre
 Monkseaton shootings

References

External links
  – official site
 
 

2010s British drama television series
2013 British television series debuts
2013 British television series endings
Television series set in 2011
2010s British crime television series
2010s British television miniseries
British thriller television series
Channel 4 television dramas
English-language television shows
Television shows set in Kent
Television shows shot in Kent